Yekaterina Sergeyevna Andryushina (August 17, 1985) is a former Russian team handball player, playing on the Russian women's national handball team. She won two gold medals with the Russian winning team at the 2007 and 2009 World Women's Handball Championship and again as assistant coach of The Netherlands Women's team in 2019.

References

External links

Russian female handball players
Handball players at the 2008 Summer Olympics
Olympic handball players of Russia
Olympic silver medalists for Russia
Living people
Sportspeople from Moscow
Olympic medalists in handball
Medalists at the 2008 Summer Olympics
1985 births